The 1895 Centenary Gentlemen football team was an American football team that represented the Centenary College of Louisiana as an independent during the 1895 college football season. In their second year while located at the Jackson, Louisiana campus, the team compiled a 1–1 record.

Schedule

References

Centenary
Centenary Gentlemen football seasons
Centenary Gentlemen football